The Rare Disease Legislative Caucus is a bipartisan congressional caucus open to all members of the United States House and Senate. The caucus is currently co-chaired by Representatives  G.K. Butterfield (D-NC) and Gus Bilirakis (R-FL) and Senators Roger Wicker (R-MS) and Amy Klobuchar (D-MN). The caucus was founded and Chaired by Congressman Fred Upton (R-MI) and Joseph Crowley in 2009.

The caucus works to advance legislation and education regarding specialized and uncommon health issues and diseases, and to promote patient advocacy. The caucus works closely with the Rare Disease Legislative Advocates group.

Mission 
The Rare Disease Legislative Caucus aims to represent constituent concerns about disease and health-related issues, influence legislation to assist citizens and families affected by rare diseases, and to facilitate conversations between the medical and patient communities.

History 
The bipartisan Rare Disease Legislative Caucus was established in 2009 by original GOP Co-chair Congressman Fred Upton (R-MI), who went on to become Chairman of the House Energy and Commerce Committee, and Congressman Joseph Crowley (D-NY). Jurisdictional issues, including Food and Drug Administration oversight, as well as a myriad of issues related to healthcare reform and committee rules, required Rep. Upton to remove himself from leadership of all Caucuses in 2011 when he became Chair of the House Energy and Commerce Committee, though he remains a member of the caucus. Upton recommended that Leonard Lance (R-NJ) take over as the Republican Co-chair of the caucus, where he now serves with Crowley.

In 2016, both Republicans and Democrats from the Senate joined the caucus, with Senator Orrin Hatch (R-UT) and Senator Amy Klobuchar (D-MN) becoming co-chairs.

Current status 
As of 2016, the Rare Disease Legislative Caucus has over 100 members from 35 states. House Representatives make up the vast majority of caucus, as the Senate only began sending members in 2016; 103 of the 109 current caucus members are from the House.

Members

Full member listing

House 
* Denotes Co-Chair

Senate 
* Denotes co-chair

References

2009 establishments in the United States